This is a list of monarchs who lost their thrones in the 13th century.

Austria
Rudolph I of Germany, Holy Roman King, Duke of Austria 1278–1282, then gave the duchy to Albert I and Rudolf II, died 1291.

Blue Horde

Talabuga, Khan of the Blue Horde 1287–1291, dethroned.

Bosnia
Stjepan Kulinić, Bosnian Ban in 1204–1232, deposed, died 1236.

Bulgaria
Boril, Emperor of Bulgaria 1207 to 1218, deposed and blinded 1218.
Kaliman II, Emperor of Bulgaria 1256, forced to flee the capital, murdered 1256.
Mitso Asen, Emperor of Bulgaria 1256 to 1257, lost power 1257, died 1277/1278.
Michael Asen II, Emperor of Bulgaria 1277 to 1279, lost power and captured by the Byzantines.
Ivan Asen III, Emperor of Bulgaria 1279–1280, deposed, died in exile in 1303.
Ivaylo, Emperor of Bulgaria 1277 to 1280, lost power, murdered 1281.
George I Terter, Emperor of Bulgaria 1280–1292, abdicated 1292, died in 1308/1309.
Ivan II, Emperor of Bulgaria 1298 to 1299, deposed, died in exile before 1330.

Byzantine Empire
Isaac II Angelus, deposed 1195, restored 1203, deposed again 1204.
Alexius III Angelus, deposed 1203.
Alexius IV Angelus, deposed 1204.
Alexius V, deposed 1204.
John IV Lascaris, deposed 1261.

Chagatai Khanate 
Qara Hülëgü, head of the ulus of the Chagatai Khanate 1242–1246 and 1252, deposed 1246, restored 1252, died 1252.
Yesü Möngke, 1252, exiled and executed.
Mubarak Shah, 1252–1260 and 1266.

Damascus
As-Salih Ismail, Sultan of Damascus 1237 and 1239–1245.
As-Salih Ayyub, Sultan of Damascus 1239 and 1245–1249.

Egypt
an-Nasir Nasir-ad-Din Muhammad, Mameluke sultan of Egypt 1293–1295, 1299–1309 and 1309–1340.

Epirus
Theodore Komnenos Doukas, Despot of Epirus 1215–1230, died c. 1253.

Golden Horde
Talabuga Khan of the Golden Horde 1287–1291, dethroned.

Holy Roman Empire
Otto IV, Holy Roman Emperor, deposed 1215.
Adolf, King of the Romans, deposed 1298.

Ilkhanate
Tekuder, Ilkhan 1282–1284, deposed and executed.

Istria
Henry II of Meran, Ruler of Istria 1204–1209, died 1228.
Otto of Meran, 1215–1230, died 1234.

Japan

Emperors
Emperor Tsuchimikado, Emperor of Japan 1198–1210, abdicated 1210, died 1231.
Emperor Juntoku, Emperor of Japan 1210–1221, abdicated 1221, died 1242.
Emperor Chūkyō, Emperor of Japan 1221, deposed 1221, died 1234.
Emperor Go-Horikawa, Emperor of Japan 1221–1232, abdicated 1232, died 1234.
Emperor Go-Saga, Emperor of Japan 1242–1246, abdicated 1246, died 1272.
Emperor Go-Fukakusa, Emperor of Japan 1246–1260, abdicated 1260, died 1304.
Emperor Kameyama, Emperor of Japan 1260–1274, abdicated 1274, died 1305.
Emperor Go-Uda, Emperor of Japan 1274–1287, abdicated 1287, died 1324.
Emperor Fushimi, Emperor of Japan 1287–1298, abdicated 1298, died 1317.

Shōguns

Minamoto no Yoriie, Kamakura Shōgun 1202–1203, forced to abdicate 1203, died 1204.
Kujō Yoritsune, Kamakura Shōgun 1226–1244, abdicated 1244, died 1256.

Latin Empire
Baldwin II of Courtenay, emperor of the Latin empire 1228–1261, deposed.

Lithuania 
Treniota, Grand Prince of Lithuania (1263–1264, deposed 1264.
Shvarn, Grand Prince of Lithuania (1267–1269), deposed, died 1269 or 1271.

Lorraine 
Simon II, Duke of Lorraine, Duke of Lorraine 1176–1205, in 1205 he retired to a monastery, died 1207.

Nassau 
Henry II of Nassau, Count of Nassau 1198–1249, ceased to reign 1249, died 1251.

Neuenburg-Strassberg
Berthold I of Neuenburg-Strassberg, ruler of Neuenburg-Strassberg 1225–1270, died 1273.

Nuremberg
Frederick II of Nuremberg, Burgrave of Nuremberg 1204–1218, title passed over to Conrad I, Burgrave of Nuremberg.

Portugal
Sancho II of Portugal, King in 1223, deposed in 1247 by his brother Alphonse, Count Consort of Boulogne.

Poznań
Mieszko III the Old, Prince of Poznań 1177–1179 and 1194–1202, died 1202.
Boleslaw V the Holy, Prince of Poznań 1241–1247 and 1257–1277, died 1279.

Rascia
Vukan Nemanjić, Grand Prince of Rascia 1202–1204, lost the throne to Stefan Nemanjić.
Stefan Nemanjić, Grand Prince of Rascia 1196–1202 and 1204–1217, deposed by Vukan Nemanjić, restored in 1204, lost the throne when the title was abolished.

Scotland
John, King of Scots, deposed 1296.

Sicily
Conradin, King of Sicily, deposed 1258 or 1268.
Charles I, King of Sicily, deposed in Sicily itself (though not in Naples), 1282.
James, King of Sicily, abdicated 1296.

Split
Matej Ninoslav, Prince of Split, deposed, 1244.

Thessalonica
Theodore Komnenos Doukas, Emperor of Thessalonica 1224 to 1230, died c. 1253.

Empire of Trebizond
Georgios Komnenos, Emperor 1266 to 1280, died after 1284

Wales
Llywelyn ap Gruffudd, Prince of Wales, murdered at Cilmeri, Dec 11th 1282.
Dafydd ap Gruffydd, Prince of Wales,  Put to death - Shrewsbury October 3, 1283.

See also
List of monarchs who abdicated
List of monarchs who lost their thrones in the 19th century
List of monarchs who lost their thrones in the 18th century
List of monarchs who lost their thrones in the 17th century
List of monarchs who lost their thrones in the 16th century
List of monarchs who lost their thrones in the 15th century
List of monarchs who lost their thrones in the 14th century
List of monarchs who lost their thrones before the 13th century

13
 
Monarchs who lost their thrones